Robert D. Peterson (March 14, 1888 – September 2, 1968) was the 20th Lieutenant Governor of South Dakota serving from 1935 to 1937 under Governor Tom Berry. Robert Peterson was from Glenwood Township in Clay County. He was married to Esther Ellenore (Bring) Peterson (1888-1916). Both he and his wife were buried in Komstad Cemetery in Clay County, South Dakota.

References

External links
Robert Peterson's historical listing at the South Dakota Legislature website.
Robert Peterson's record at Political Graveyard.

1888 births
Lieutenant Governors of South Dakota
1968 deaths
20th-century American politicians
American people of Swedish descent